Ghetto Life is the second album from Jamaican reggae musician Jah Cure. It was released in 2003 and includes contributions from Sizzla and Jah Mason.

Track listing
 Every Song I Sing
 King in This Jungle featuring Sizzla
 Western Region
 Zion Way
 Run Come Love Me featuring Jah Mason
 Zion Await
 Hail to the King
 Trust Me
 Ghetto Life
 How Can I
 The Love of My Life
 Hanging Slowly
 Dung in Deh
 Vibes Man a Build
 Keep On

References

2003 albums
Jah Cure albums